Ercé-près-Liffré (literally Ercé near Liffré) is a commune in the Ille-et-Vilaine department in Brittany in northwestern France. It is about 20 km northeast of Rennes.

Population
Inhabitants of Ercé-près-Liffré are called Ercéens in French.

See also
Communes of the Ille-et-Vilaine department
Jean-Marie Valentin

References

External links

Mayors of Ille-et-Vilaine Association  

Communes of Ille-et-Vilaine